Para-badminton is a variant of badminton for athletes with a range of physical disabilities. Badminton World Federation (BWF) is the main governing body for para-badminton starting from June 2011. The sport was governed by Para Badminton World Federation (PBWF) until a unanimous decision to join BWF during a meeting in Dortmund in June 2011.

Classification
Players are classified to six different classes determined by BWF:

Wheelchair
 WH1Players in this class are those who have impairment in both lower limbs and trunk function and require wheelchair to play
 WH2Players have impairment in one or both lower limbs and minimal or no impairment of the trunk and also require wheelchair

Standing

 SL3Players have impairment in one or both lower limbs and poor walking/running balance
 SL4Players have impairment in one or both lower limbs and minimal impairment in walking/running balance (better walking/running compared to SL3)
 SU5Players have impairment of the upper limbs.

Short stature

 SH6Players in this class have short stature caused by achondroplasia or other genetic conditions.

Competitions
BWF organizes the bi-annual Para-badminton World Championships in odd numbered years and continental championships in even numbered years. Para-badminton also features in other multi sports events like the Asian Para Games and ASEAN Para Games.

Para-badminton will also feature at the 2020 Paralympic Games in Tokyo.

References

 
Paralympic sports